The Harari people (Harari:  Gēy Usuach, "People of the City") are Semitic-speaking ethnic group inhabiting the Horn of Africa. Members traditionally reside in the walled city of Harar, called simply Gēy "the City" in Harari, situated in the Harari Region of eastern Ethiopia. They speak the Harari language, a member of the South Ethiopic grouping within the Semitic subfamily of the Afroasiatic languages.

History

The Harla people, an extinct Afroasiatic-speaking people native to Hararghe, are considered by most scholars to be the precursors to the Harari people. The ancestors of the Hararis moved across the Bab-el-Mandeb, settling in the shores of Somaliland and later expanding into the interior producing a Semitic-speaking population among Cushitic and non-Afroasiatic-speaking peoples in what would become Harar.

Sheikh Abadir, the legendary patriarch of the Harari, is said to have arrived in the Harar plateau in the early thirteenth century, where he was met by the Harla, Gaturi and Argobba people. In the middle ages Hararis led by Abadir supposedly came into conflict with the Shirazi people who had occupied Somalia's coast. By the thirteenth century, the Hararis were among the administrators of the Ifat Sultanate. In the fourteenth century raids on the Harari town of Get (Gey) by Abyssinian Emperor Amda Seyon I, Hararis are referred to as Harlas. Ifat state under Haqq ad-Din II relocated their base to the Harari plateau (Adal) in the fourteenth century. An alliance kingdom ensued between Argobba and Harari people designated the Adal Sultanate which later included Afar and Somali people. In the sixteenth century under Ahmed ibn Ibrahim al-Ghazi, the Harari state stretched to large parts of the Horn of Africa. During the Ethiopian–Adal war, some Harari militia (malassay) settled in Gurage territory, forming the Siltʼe people. Hararis once represented the largest concentration of agriculturalists in East Africa.

In the sixteenth century, walls built around the city of Harar during the reign of Emir Nur ibn Mujahid helped preserve Harari identity from being assimilated by the Oromo. Harari colonies in the middle of the seaboard and Harar were also assimilated by Somalis putting the Sultanate of Harar under duress. Hararis confined in the walled city became the last remnants of a once large ethnic group that inhabited the region. According to Ulrich Braukämper, the Harla-Harari were most likely active in the region prior to the Adal Sultanate's Islamic invasion of Ethiopia.

The sixteenth century saw Oromos invading regions of the Somali peninsula from the northern areas of Hargeisa to its southern portions such as Lower Juba, incorporating the Harari people. Hararis were furious when Muhammad Jasa decided to move the Adal Sultanate's capital from Harar to Aussa in 1577 in response to Oromo threats. In less than a year after its relocation Adal would collapse. Harari imams continued to have a presence in the southern Afar Region in the Imamate of Aussa until they were overthrown in the eighteenth century by the Mudaito dynasty, who later established the Sultanate of Aussa.

Among the assimilated peoples were Arab Muslims that arrived during the start of the Islamic period, as well as Argobba and other migrants that were drawn to Harar's well-developed culture. Statistics prove that a Semitic-speaking people akin to the Harari may have inhabited a stretch of land between the Karkaar Mountains, the middle Awash and Jijiga. Oromo migrations have effectively split this putative ethnolinguistic block to the Lake Zway islands, Gurage territory, and Harar. Following the decline of the Adal Sultanate's ascendancy in the area, a large number of the Harari were in turn reportedly absorbed into the Oromo community. In the Emirate of Harar period, Hararis sent missionaries to convert Oromo to Islam. The loss of the crucial Battle of Chelenqo marked the end of Harar's independence in 1887. Hararis supported the designated but uncrowned Emperor of Ethiopia Lij Iyasu, and his presumed efforts to make Harar the capital of an African Islamic empire. Iyasu was however overthrown in 1916, and many of his Harari followers were jailed.

Chafing under imperial Ethiopian rule, Hararis made several attempts to cut ties with Ethiopia and unify Hararghe with Somalia, among them launching the nationalist Kulub movement which was linked to the Somali Youth League. These events led to the Haile Selassie government's ethnic cleansing efforts on Hararis. A Harar Oromo proverb alludes to this occasion: "On that day Hararis were eliminated from earth." Former Mayor of Harar Bereket Selassie reported that both the Amhara and Oromo viewed Hararis with contempt. Haile Selassie's overthrow by the Derg communist regime made minor differences for the Harari; they describe it as "little more than a transition from the frying pan into the fire". The 1975 rural act disenfranchised Hararis from their farm land, forcing many to emigrate. The surviving Harari relatives of Kulub movement members would join the Somali Armed Forces; and some, having been promoted as high-ranking military officers, fought in the Ogaden War to free Harari and Somali territory from Ethiopian rule. Hararis were also involved in the WSLF. After Ethiopians won the war in Ogaden, Derg soldiers began massacring civilians in Harari areas of Addis Ababa for collaborating with Somalis. The aftermath of the Ogaden war resulted in 200,000 Hararis being held at southern Somalia's refuge camps in 1979. Today Hararis are outnumbered in their own state by the Amhara and Oromo peoples. Under the Meles Zenawi administration, Hararis had been favored tremendously. They acquired control of their Harari Region again, and have been given special rights not offered to other groups in the region. According to academic Sarah Vaughan, the Harari People's National Regional State was created to overturn the historically bad relationship between Harar and the Ethiopian government.

Some Hararis as well as the Somali Sheekhal and Hadiya Halaba clans assert descent from Abadir Umar ar-Rida, also known as Fiqi Umar, who traced his lineage to the first caliph, Abu Bakr. According to the explorer Richard Francis Burton, "Fiqi Umar" crossed over from the Arabian Peninsula to the Horn of Africa ten generations prior to 1854, with his six sons: Umar the Greater, Umar the Lesser, the two Abdillahs, Ahmad and Siddiq. According to Hararis, they also consist of seven Harla subclans: Abogn, Adish, Awari, Gidaya, Gaturi, Hargaya, and Wargar. The Harari were previously known as "Adere", although this term is now considered derogatory.

Arsi Oromo state an intermarriage took place between their ancestors and the previous inhabitants Adere (Harari) whom they call the Hadiya. Hadiya clans claim their forefathers were Harari however they later became influenced by Sidama. Moreover the Habar Habusheed, a major branch of the Somali Isaaq clan family consisting of the Habr Je'lo, Sanbur, Ibran and Tol Je'lo clans in Somaliland and Ethiopia, hold the tradition that they originate from an intermarriage between a Harari woman and their forefather Sheikh Ishaaq.

Language

The Harari people speak the Harari language, an Ethiosemitic language referred to as Gey Sinan or Gēy Ritma ("Language of the City"). It is closely related to the eastern Gurage languages and similar to Zay and Silt'e, all of whom are linked to the Semitisized Harla language. Old Harari already had many Arabic loanwords, proven by the ancient texts. Northern Somali dialects use Harari loanwords. The Zeila songs of thirteenth century origin, popular in Somaliland are considered to be using Old Harari. Historians states the language spoken by the Imams and Sultans of Adal would closely resemble contemporary Harari language.

Modern Harari is influenced more by Oromo than Somali and the presence of Arabic is still there. After the eighteenth century Egyptian conquest of Harar, numerous loanwords were additionally borrowed from Egyptian Arabic.

Gafat language, now extinct, was once spoken in the Blue Nile was related to a Harari dialect. Harari language has some form of correlation with Swahili and Maghrebi Arabic. Prior to Oromo encircling the Harar region, its postulated Harari speakers were in direct contact with Sidama, Afar and Somali.

The Harari language was historically written using the Arabic script and in characters known as "Harari secret script" of unknown origin. More recently in the 1990s, it has been transcribed with the Ge'ez script. Harari is also commonly written in Latin outside of Ethiopia.

The 1994 Ethiopian census indicates that there were 21,757 Harari speakers. About 20,000 of these individuals were concentrated outside Harar, in Ethiopia's capital Addis Ababa.

Most Harari people are bilingual in Amharic and Oromo, both of which are also Afro-Asiatic languages. According to the 1994 Ethiopian census, about 2,351 are monolingual, speaking only Harari.

Religion
Virtually all Harari are Sunni Muslim. The predominant strand or self-identification adopted by Harari people is Sunni or non-denominational Islam.

Diaspora
Hararis comprise under 10% within their own city, due to ethnic cleansing by the Haile Selassie regime. Thousands of Hararis were forced to leave Harar in the 1940s. Harari people moved throughout Ethiopia, mainly to Addis Ababa and Dire Dawa, establishing families and businesses. There is a considerable Harari population in Djibouti, Saudi Arabia, Somaliland and Yemen. The Harari people have also spread throughout North America, mainly to Washington D.C., Atlanta, Toronto, Dallas, Los Angeles, and Memphis. Furthermore, a minority of the Harari people live in Europe in countries such as Germany, Switzerland, Austria, Sweden and the United Kingdom.

Notable Hararis
Abdullah al-Harari, leader of the al-Ahbash Sunni Sufi movement
'Abd Allah II ibn 'Ali 'Abd ash-Shakur, last Emir of Harar
`Ali ibn Da`ud, founder of the Emirate of Harar
Mahfuz, Imam and General of the Adal Sultanate
Bati del Wambara, Queen of the Adal Sultanate
 Ahmad ibn Ibrahim al-Ghazi, Imam and General of the Adal Sultanate
Nur ibn Mujahid, founder of Sultanate of Harar
Abdullahi Sadiq,  businessman and Governor of Ogaden
Abun Adashe, Emir of the Adal Sultanate
 Duri Mohammed, former President of Addis Ababa University
Kabir Khalil, 19th century Muslim scholar in the Emirate of Harar

See also
Garad, an old Harari title
Malassay, Harari corps
Kabir, title for scholar in the Emirate of Harar
Aw, title for father
Harari Region
Harar City - Diaspora 
East Hararghe Zone
List of Emirs of Harar
Sultanate of Harar

References

Habesha peoples
Ethnic groups in Ethiopia